Nhill is a town in the Wimmera, in western Victoria, Australia. Nhill is located on the Western Highway, halfway between Adelaide and Melbourne.
population of 1,749. "Nhill" is believed to be a Wergaia word meaning "early morning mist rising over water" or "white mist rising from the water".

Nhill is the administrative headquarters for Shire of Hindmarsh and residents are mainly employed in either farming or food processing, most notably in grain and fowl.

The town is home to a community of Karen people, the first of whom came to Australia as refugees, and who settled in Nhill in the early 2010s to work at the Luv-a-Duck food processing facility. In 2012, there were over 100 Karen residents in Nhill.

History
The formally recognised traditional owners for the area in which Nhill sits are the Wotjobaluk, Jaadwa, Jadawadjali, Wergaia and Jupagik Nations. These Nations are represented by the Barengi Gadjin Land Council Aboriginal Corporation.

The area has been home to the Aboriginal people for thousands of years and was first visited by Europeans in 1845. The famous Aboriginal tracker and cricketer, Dick-a-Dick, later claimed to have been present at the first meeting between the Wotjobaluk and Europeans. Brothers Frank and John Oliver decided to build a  flour mill on Crown land beside the Dimboola-Lawloit road, the township of Nhill grew from there.

Cobb and Co coaches serviced Nhill from 1883. Nhill Post Office opened on 1 January 1881. An earlier rural office (1861) was replaced by Lawloit Post Office 

Nhill was the first Victorian town after the state capital, Melbourne, to be supplied with electricity. Electric lighting was installed by 1892.

Nhill airport, located 1.9 km north-west of the town, served as a major RAAF training base during the Second World War, instructing over 10,000 aircrew in 1941-1946.

Demographics
As of the 2016 census, 1,749 people resided in Nhill. The median age of persons in Nhill was 48 years. Children aged 0–14 years made up 14.5% of the population. People over the age of 65 years made up 29.7% of the population There were slightly more females than males with 52.1% of the population female and 47.9% male. The average household size is 2.2 persons per household. The average number of children per family for families with children is 1.9.

80.3% of people in Nhill were born in Australia. Of all persons living in Nhill, 1.3% (22 persons) were Aboriginal and/or Torres Strait Islander people. This is higher than for the state of Victoria (0.8%) and lower than the national average (2.8%). The most common ancestries in Nhill were English 31.5%, Australian 29.6%, German 10.2%, Scottish 6.7% and Karen 5.4%.

The 2016 Australian census listed the main religions in Nhill as Uniting Church 21.8%, Anglican 14.6% and Catholic 11.1%, Lutheran 10.5%. 20.4% recorded "no religion".

Industry and facilities
The major employer in the town is Luv-a-Duck—a duck meat grower and processor—and associated businesses. Tourism is another local industry; Nhill services the highway traffic passing through. Nhill is recognised by the transport industry as the halfway point by road between Melbourne and Adelaide. Transport companies use Nhill as their 'changeover' point. Nhill railway station is serviced by The Overland that stops three times a week. Air services are at Nhill Airport. Bus services are provided by V/Line and Firefly several times daily.

Nhill has three hotels; the Commercial Hotel, the Farmers Arms Hotel and the Union Hotel. Nhill has a caravan park and a number of motels.

Nhill has a Lutheran Primary school, a Catholic Primary School and a P-12 public school.

Events and attractions
The Nhill Show is held each year on the second Thursday of October. It includes rides, farm animals, rural Australian farm machinery, horse riding show, art competitions, cooking competitions, photo competitions and at the closing of the Show there is a fireworks display. Up until 2012 Nhill hosted a "Duck & Jazz Festival" in mid February.

The release of the film Road to Nhill in 1997 briefly placed Nhill in the national spotlight.

The Nhill Aviation Heritage Centre is located at nearby historical Nhill airport. Included in its displays is a rare Avro Anson aircraft undergoing restoration.  In April 2018, it also acquired a rare Wirraway aeroplane, to much public support and fanfare.

The Australian Pinball Museum is located at the eastern side of Nhill adjacent to an old "Route 66"-esque motel. Included in its displays of rare pinball related artwork and memorabilia is the largest selection of pinball machines available to play in Australia.

Sport
Nhill has an Australian Rules football team competing in the Wimmera Football League. Nhill is also the base of the Cricket competition known as the West Wimmera Cricket Association. Nhill & Districts sporting club which includes football, Netball, Hockey and Cricket. Also it has a Tennis club and Pony Club. Nhill has a golf course at the Nhill Golf Club on Netherby Road.

Nhill was the birthplace of Masters Australian football (a.k.a. "Superules").

The horse racing club, the Wimmera Racing Club, holds the Nhill Cup meeting on Boxing day (26 December).

Notable people
The indigenous cricketer Dick-a-Dick was born near Nhill about 1834.

Nhill is the hometown of former Australian rules football player Jason McCartney, who suffered severe injuries during the 2002 Bali terrorist bombing, and later recovered enough to make a comeback to the sport.

Nhill is the birthplace of Janet Powell, leader of the Australian Democrats between 1990 and 1991; and Senator for Victoria between 1986 and 1993.

Nhill is the birthplace of David Leyonhjelm, former NSW senator of the Liberal Democratic Party.

Former Essendon footballers David Flood and Dean Wallis are from Nhill.

Nhill is the hometown of Lucy Stephan, a rower who has represented Australia, winning a bronze medal in the Women’s Four event at the 2013 Rowing World Championships in Korea and won Gold at the 2020 Tokyo Olympics in the Women's Coxless Four.

Mars
The name Nhill has been used for a crater on the planet Mars.  The name was adopted by the International Astronomical Union in 1991, commemorating a "Town in Victoria, Australia".

References

External links

Nhill College Website

Towns in Victoria (Australia)
Wimmera